Gobang Linux is a Linux distribution built on Ubuntu.

Openbox is the default window manager. The project has a perspective to offer a lightweight and fast System.

The users can find two different types of ISO's to use to install - the X86 and X86_64 - all install method is guided by a GUI. A post-install script can be launched after the first install to guide the users to easily find other software and tools to install on GobangOS.

System Requirements
 Preferred: 512 MB of RAM and 2 GB of hard drive space.
 Minimum: 128 MB of RAM and 2 GB of hard drive space.
 Installation: around 1 GB of hard drive space.

Download

References

Linux software